is a former member of the Japanese idol girl group SKE48. She was a member of SKE48's Team E.

She started her career as an announcer after graduation from SKE48.

Career 
Shibata passed SKE48's 4th generation auditions in September 2010. Her audition song was "Stay with me" by Kaoru Amane. On December 6, 2010, she was selected to form Team E.

She went on a hiatus from February 2011 to March 2011.

In April 2013, during SKE48's shuffle, Shibata was transferred to Team KII. Later in June 2013, she ranked for the first time in AKB48's general elections, placing 17th with 39,739 votes. Her first SKE48 Senbatsu was for the single "Sansei Kawaii!".

In February 2014, during the AKB48 Group Shuffle, it was announced she would be transferred back to Team E. In AKB48's 2014 general elections, she placed 15th with 39,264 votes.

Her future dream is to be a talent.

On 26 August 2016, her graduation concert, titled "Shibata Aya Sotsugyō Kanshasai: Demo Aya-chan Kara wa Sotsugyō Shimasen!" was held at Zepp Nagoya. Her last theater performance was held at SKE48 Theater  on August 31, 2016.

Discography

SKE48 singles

AKB48 singles

Appearances

Dramas
 Fortune Cookies (Fuji TV, 2013)
 AKB Horror Night Adrenalin's Night Episode 18 (TV Asahi, 2015)

References

External links
 
 Official Blog 
 Aya Shibata on Google+

1993 births
Living people
Japanese idols
Japanese women pop singers
Musicians from Aichi Prefecture
SKE48 members